The 2016 Copa do Brasil (officially the Copa Continental Pneus do Brasil 2016 for sponsorship reasons) was the 28th edition of the Copa do Brasil football competition. The competition was contested by 86 teams, which qualified either by their respective state championships (70), by the 2016 CBF ranking (10) or those qualified for 2015 Copa Libertadores (5) and the team with the best 2015 Série A record (excluding those qualified for 2016 Copa Libertadores). The latter six clubs entered the competition in the round of 16. The best six teams of the 2015 Campeonato Brasileiro Série A eliminated until the third round qualified for the 2016 Copa Sudamericana.

Format
The competition was a single elimination knockout tournament featuring two-legged ties. In the first two rounds, if the away team won the first match by two or more goals, it progressed straight to the next round and avoided the second leg. The away goals rule was also used in the Copa do Brasil, with the exception of the finals. The winner qualified for the 2017 Copa Libertadores.

Qualified teams
The teams in bold are qualified directly for the round of 16.

Draw
A draw for the first round was held by CBF on January 11, 2016. The 80 qualified teams were divided in eight groups (A-H) with 10 teams each. That division was based on the 2016 CBF ranking and the matches were drawn from the respective pots: A vs. E; B vs. F; C vs. G; D vs. H. The lower ranked teams of each match hosted the first leg. Before the round of 16 there was another draw including the six teams that directly qualified for that round. All draws were at CBF headquarters in Rio de Janeiro.

Seeding

2016 CBF ranking shown in brackets.

First round

Second round

Third round

Copa Sudamericana qualification

The best six teams eliminated before the round of 16 with the best 2015 Série A or 2015 Série B record (excluding those directly qualified for the round of 16) qualified for 2016 Copa Sudamericana.

1 Santa Cruz qualified as (Brazil 7) in the 2016 Copa Sudamericana, independently of qualifying position of the other seven teams.

Knockout stages

A draw by CBF was held to set the matches for the round of 16. The 16 qualified teams were divided in two pots (1-2). Teams from pot 1 were the six teams directly qualified to the round of 16, the five teams that competed at the 2016 Copa Libertadores and the best placed team in the 2015 Campeonato Brasileiro Série A not taking part in the 2016 Copa Libertadores, plus the two highest CBF ranked teams in 2016 qualified via the third round. Pot 2 was composed of the other teams that qualified through the third round. Each pot was divided into 4 pairs according to the CBF ranking. That division made sure that each team within a pair would not face each other before the finals as they would be placed in opposite sides of the bracket. The draw also decided the home team of the round of 16. The following stages had additional draws to determine the order of the matches as the tournament advanced. All draws will be held at CBF headquarters in Rio de Janeiro.

Seeding
2016 CBF ranking shown in brackets.

Bracket

Round of 16

Quarterfinals

Semifinals

Finals

References

 
2016
2016 domestic association football cups
2016 in Brazilian football